The 82 class are a class of diesel locomotives built by Clyde Engineering, Braemar for FreightCorp in 1994–1995.

History
In 1992, a fleet of 55 EMD JT42C locomotives was ordered from Clyde Engineering, which was later increased to 58. The design was based on the prototype locomotive GML10 built by Clyde Engineering, Kelso in 1990. They have two cabs, built in a hood style. They were originally to be built at Kelso, but a lack of capacity saw Clyde Engineering lease Australian National Industries' Braemar plant.

Early artists' impressions showed them numbered as the 94 class. The first two were originally numbered 9401 and 9402 but renumbered 8201 and 8202 before leaving the factory.

In October 1997, three were destroyed in the Beresfield rail accident (8219, 8246, 8247). The remaining 55 were included in the sale of FreightCorp to Pacific National in February 2002.

On 5 June 2014, 8221 caught fire near Awaba while running as the fourth locomotive on a loaded ER64 coal service. The locomotive was subsequently hauled to EDI Cardiff where examination was undertaken to determine the cause of the fire, ultimately being attributed to a fuel leak. Having suffered substantial damage, the locomotive remained stored at Cardiff for some time before being progressively stripped, and eventually scrapped, in October 2016.

The 82 class are being progressively repainted to Pacific National livery, commencing with 8202 in August 2016. The balance of the fleet are in FreightCorp livery, with Pacific National decals.

82 class are mostly allocated to Pacific National's grain services throughout NSW, with only a few remaining allocated to coal.

References

Clyde Engineering locomotives
Co-Co locomotives
Diesel locomotives of New South Wales
Pacific National diesel locomotives
Railway locomotives introduced in 1994
Standard gauge locomotives of Australia
Diesel-electric locomotives of Australia